M series may refer to:

Computers
 M series (computer), a line of computers designed in the USSR
 ThinkCentre M series, a line of desktop computers
 Sony Vaio M series, a line of desktop computers and a line of netbook computers

Mobile phones
 Samsung Galaxy M series
 Sony Ericsson M series
 Meizu M series

Transportation
 M series (Toronto subway)
 Bedford M series, a truck chassis
 Cummins M-series engine, a diesel engine for buses and trucks
 Dodge M-series chassis, a motorhome chassis
 Rover M-series engine, a line of 4-cylinder gasoline car engines
 Studebaker M-series truck
 TVR M series, a series of sports cars

Other uses
 M-series bayonet
 Juniper M series, a series of routers
 Leica M series, a series of cameras
 QI (M series), the twelfth series of quiz show QI

See also
 L series (disambiguation)
 N series (disambiguation)